Hesperopsis alpheus, the saltbush sootywing, is a species of spread-wing skipper in the butterfly family Hesperiidae. It is found in Central America and North America.

The MONA or Hodges number for Hesperopsis alpheus is 3980.

Subspecies
These three subspecies belong to the species Hesperopsis alpheus:
 Hesperopsis alpheus alpheus (W. H. Edwards, 1876)
 Hesperopsis alpheus oricus (W. H. Edwards, 1879)
 Hesperopsis alpheus texana Scott, 1981

References

Further reading

 

Pyrginae
Articles created by Qbugbot
Butterflies described in 1876